Brachyphyllum (meaning "short leaf") is a form genus of fossil coniferous plant foliage. Plants of the genus have been variously assigned to several different conifer groups including Araucariaceae and Cheirolepidiaceae. They are known from around the globe from the Late Carboniferous to the Late Cretaceous periods.

List of species 
 † B. yorkense
 † B. castatum
 † B. castilhoi
 † B. punctatum
 † B. sattlerae - a taxon from the Crato Formation of Brazil, named after the fictional palaebotanist Ellie Sattler from the Jurassic Park franchise.
 † B. japonicum

Location of palaeontological sites 
 In Paleorrota geopark in Brazil; Upper Triassic period, the Caturrita Formation
 The Caballos Formation of Tolima, Colombia
 The El Plan Formation of the Department of Francisco Morazan, Honduras
The Crato Formation of Brazil 
The Hasandong Formation and Jinju Formation of South Korea

Correspondence with other plant elements 
Amongst Cheirolepidiaceae, Brachyphyllum is known to be associated with the conifer cones Pararaucaria and Kachaikestrobus. Whilst amongst the Araucariaceae, it is has been associated with the pollen cone Rabagostrobus.

References

Bibliography 
 

Araucariaceae
Prehistoric gymnosperm genera
Carboniferous first appearances
Induan genera
Olenekian genera
Anisian genera
Ladinian genera
Carnian genera
Norian genera
Rhaetian genera
Hettangian genera
Sinemurian genera
Pliensbachian genera
Toarcian genera
Aalenian genera
Bajocian genera
Bathonian genera
Callovian genera
Oxfordian genera
Kimmeridgian genera
Tithonian genera
Berriasian genera
Valanginian genera
Hauterivian genera
Barremian genera
Aptian genera
Albian genera
Cenomanian genera
Late Cretaceous extinctions
Paleozoic Africa
Paleozoic life of Australia
Paleozoic life of North America
Mesozoic life of Africa
Mesozoic Antarctica
Mesozoic life of Asia
Mesozoic Australia
Mesozoic life of Europe
Mesozoic life of North America
Mesozoic life of South America
Jurassic Argentina
Cretaceous Argentina
Jurassic Chile
Cretaceous Colombia
Fossil taxa described in 1828